The Wasting is a 2017 Canadian-British drama film written and directed by Carolyn Saunders and starring  Lauren McQueen, Gray O'Brien, and Alexz Johnson.  It screened at film festivals in Europe and North America, winning Best Horror at the 2017 Austrian Independent Film Festival and Best Feature awards in two categories at the Vittorio Veneto film festival.  The film's public premiere took place in Toronto on March 2, 2018, and it was released online in the United States and Canada in June 2018.

Plot
A teenage woman faces emotional challenges – a budding romance with her new boyfriend and growing conflicts with her father's strictness.  While trying to deal with these issues, she stops eating.  While her health deteriorates because of her eating disorder, she sees the ghost of a frightening old woman every night.  Her friends and family believe these sightings are hallucinatory or mere nightmares.  With no one believing her, she must search for a solution.

Cast
Alexz Johnson as Grace
Gray O'Brien as Ilyas
Lauren McQueen as Sophie
Shelagh McLeod as Valerie
Peter Sacco as Dr. Barlas
Brendan Flynn as Kai
Anna Treasure as Virginia
Sean Saunders Stevenson as Liam
Jacqueline McMillan as Dr. Hiddleston
Catriona McDonald as Philippa

Production
Writer-director Saunders said that her inspiration came while writing for the documentary series Ghostly Encounters, when she met an anorexic young woman whom nobody believed was visited nightly by a ghost. The woman's story became the television episode, "Anorexia and the Haunting Hag," and, intrigued by the relationship between eating disorders and the supernatural, Saunders wrote The Wasting "with input from several people suffering anorexia."

Initially, the filmmakers attempted to fund the movie through the Canadian Film Centre's CFC Features program, which would have required filming in Canada. When Canadian Film Centre funding was unavailable, production was moved to Upton-upon-Severn in Worcestershire, U.K., to benefit from the UK Film Tax Relief program and the availability of experienced crew and actors.

During early development of the film, Saunders approached her friend Alexz Johnson to participate as actor, musician, and co-producer.  Saunders described the movie as a "family affair," as her sons, Brendan Flynn and Sean Stevenson appear in the cast as brothers.

Release
The Wasting premiered to excellent reviews at the 2017 Borrego Springs Film Festival in Borrego Springs, California.  The film won the Best Horror award at the 2017 Austrian Independent Film Festival, and was an official selection at the Carmarthen Bay Film Festival, the Madeira Film Festival, and the Nevada Women's Film Festival.  At the Vittorio Veneto film festival, The Wasting won the Monte Pizzoc and Monte Visentin awards, voted by more than 1000 young adults in the audience.

North American rights to distribute The Wasting were acquired by IndieCan Entertainment in 2017. In 2018, the North American premiere of the film took place in Toronto.  The online release of the film for Canada and the United States took place in June 2018.

Critical reception
At its Borrego Springs Film Festival premiere, Steve Oldfield of FoxTV called The Wasting "a mind-bending visual feast" and said "director Carolyn Saunders' first feature shows she is a force to be reckoned with - a visual storyteller with a gift for creating suspense."  After a sold out premiere screening in Toronto, The Extra Mile said "Saunders has woven many visual and sound elements to create a compelling film that shines a light on perception and reality," praising Lauren McQueen's "stellar performance" and the "poignant portrayals of Johnson, Flynn and Stevenson."  Leora Heilbronn in Brief Take said "there’s a hauntingly ghoulish subplot in there that’s reminiscent of a Gaskell or Poe story, but the film also tackles the all too prevalent acceptance of toxic masculinity and anorexia in a refreshingly original way." Edmonton Movie Guide called it "a thoughtful, complex film" in which "the characters are well drawn and realistic, strongly portrayed by the young, highly watchable cast."  Other reviews were mixed, and mostly positive.

References

External links

2017 films
2017 horror films
British horror drama films
Canadian horror drama films
English-language Canadian films
2010s ghost films
2010s English-language films
2010s Canadian films
2010s British films